Unsung is an EP released through Solid State Records on December 6, 2005 by Christian Hardcore/Mathcore group The Chariot. It contains two new songs and four re-worked versions of songs from their debut album Everything Is Alive, Everything Is Breathing, Nothing Is Dead, and Nothing Is Bleeding. The EP also marks the first use of the Chariot's iconic "skull" image on the CD's artwork.

Track listing
 "Yanni Depp" - 2:41
 "Phil Cosby (Before There Was Atlanta, There Was Douglasville)" - 2:13
 "Vin Affleck (Goodnight My Lady And A Forever Farewell)" - 2:43
 "Kenny Gibler (Play The Piano Like A Disease)" - 4:07
 "Sargent Savage (Die Interviewer [Germanickly Speaking])" - 1:56
 "Donnie Cash (The Company, The Comfort, The Grave)" - 2:24

Track #4, "Kenny Gibbler", was re-recorded for "The Fiancée" album.  The re-recorded version features Paramore vocalist Hayley Williams accompanying Josh Scogin.  The track was re-titled as "Then Came to Kill".

Credits
Josh Scogin - Vocals
Jake Ryan - Drums
Keller "Virtuoso" Harbin - Guitar, vocals, drums, bass, piano, banjo, bagpipe, mandolin, violin, acoustic
Joshua Beiser - Bass
Neil Fox - Vocals
Mike Watts - Mixing

References

2005 EPs
The Chariot (band) albums
Tooth & Nail Records EPs
Solid State Records EPs